Furlong is an unincorporated community in Bucks County, Pennsylvania, United States. Furlong is located at the intersection of Pennsylvania Route 263 and Edison-Furlong Road/Forest Grove Road on the border of Buckingham and Doylestown townships.

References

Unincorporated communities in Bucks County, Pennsylvania
Unincorporated communities in Pennsylvania